Davis Allen (1916-1999) was an American interior designer and furniture designer. He was noted as a pioneer in the design of interior corporate environments and had a forty-year tenure at Skidmore, Owings & Merrill. In1983 he designed the "Andover" chair for Stendig International (reintroduced as the "Exeter" chair by the Knoll furniture company in 1993). In 1985, he was inducted into the Interior Design Magazine Hall Of Fame.

Notes 

American interior designers
American furniture designers
1916 births
1999 deaths
Design